Dorothy Auchterlonie  (also known as Dorothy Green) (28 May 1915 – 21 February 1991) was an English-born Australian academic, literary critic and poet.

Life

Auchterlonie was born in Sunderland, County Durham in England. In 1927 when she was 12 years old, her family moved to Australia.

Educated in both England and Australia, Auchterlonie went on to study at the University of Sydney, where she completed a first-class honours and then an M.A. in English. During her time there Auchterlonie became a member of an elite group that included the brilliant and flamboyant poet James McAuley, Joan Fraser (who wrote under the pseudonym Amy Witting), Harold Stewart, Oliver Somerville, Alan Crawford and Ronald Dunlop.  James McAuley and Harold Stewart were later to become notorious for perpetrating the Ern Malley hoax.  The group was described by Peter Coleman in his book on James McAuley, as the 'sourly brilliant literary circle', an oblique reference to Thomas de Quincey.

In 1944, Auchterlonie married literary historian and critic, H. M. Green (1881–1962), who was then the Librarian at the University of Sydney.

Auchterlonie worked as an ABC broadcaster and journalist in Sydney, Brisbane and Canberra from 1942 to 1949, and in 1955 became co-principal of a Queensland school. In 1961 she became the first female lecturer at Monash University, lecturing in literature. Her teaching career included positions at both the Australian National University and the Australian Defence Force Academy.

During her academic career (1961–1987) she threw herself into championing Australian literature and publishing literary criticism to re establish authors she felt were undervalued, notably Martin Boyd, E. L. Grant Watson, Patrick White, 'Henry Handel Richardson', Christopher Brennan, Christina Stead and Kylie Tennant. In 1963, after publisher Angus & Robertson had approached her for an abridgement suitable for students, she began to revise her husband H. M. Green's massive History of Australian Literature, republished in two volumes in 1985. Her major study of Henry Handel Richardson, Ulysses Bound was published in 1973 and revised in 1986. From 1970 she had begun researching a major biography of writer and biologist E. L. Grant Watson, which led to the publication of Descent of Spirit in 1990, but at her death in 1991 the project remained uncompleted.

Along with supporting environmental causes and volunteer work for the Australian Council of Churches, she was also prominent in campaigning with an ADFA colleague, David Headon, in speeches and writing against nuclear arms. She visited Moscow in 1987 as one of nine Australian delegates invited to a peace forum by the USSR Government.

In 1991 a collection of Auchterlonie's writings and papers was purchased by the National Library of Australia. Additional papers and documents are held in the Australian Defence Force Academy Library, Canberra.

Recognition
Auchterlonie was awarded a Medal of the Order of Australia (OAM) in 1984 and was made an Officer of the Order of Australia (AO) in 1988 for her services to literature, teaching and writing.

Bibliography

As Dorothy Green

 Fourteen Minutes (1950; with H. M. Green)
 H. M. Green's History of Australian Literature Vols 1 & 2 (revised by D.G.) Angus & Robertson, Australia 1984
 The Music of Love: critical essays on literature and life Penguin Books,  Melbourne 1984
 Ulysses Bound: a study of Henry Handel Richardson and her fiction Allen & Unwin, Sydney 1986
  Imagining the Real: Australian Writing in the Nuclear Age (ed. with David Headon) ABC Enterprises,  Sydney 1987
 Descent of Spirit: Writings of E.L. Grant Watson (ed.) Primavera Press, Sydney 1990
 The Writer, the Reader and the Critic in a Monoculture, Foundation for Australian Literary Studies 1986; Primavera Press, Sydney 1991

As Dorothy Auchterlounie:

 Kaleidoscope Viking Press, Sydney 1940

As Dorothy Auchterlonie

 The Dolphin ANU Press, Canberra 1967
 Something to Someone: Poems Brindabella Press, Canberra 1983

Notes

References

 
 MS 5678 Papers of Dorothy Green (1915–1991)

1915 births
1991 deaths
Australian literary critics
University of Sydney alumni
Academic staff of Monash University
Academic staff of the Australian National University
Officers of the Order of Australia
Recipients of the Medal of the Order of Australia
Australian women poets
Australian women literary critics
Australian anti–nuclear weapons activists
20th-century Australian women writers
20th-century Australian poets
British emigrants to Australia